Markus Wieland (born 26 May 1976) is a German ice hockey player. He competed in the men's tournament at the 1998 Winter Olympics.

Career statistics

Regular season and playoffs

International

References

External links
 

1976 births
Living people
German ice hockey defencemen
Olympic ice hockey players of Germany
Ice hockey players at the 1998 Winter Olympics
People from Miesbach (district)
Sportspeople from Upper Bavaria
EHC München players
SC Bietigheim-Bissingen players
ERC Ingolstadt players
Starbulls Rosenheim players
EC Bad Tölz players
Adler Mannheim players
EV Landshut players